The Army Sustainment Resource Portal (formerly Sustainment Unit One Stop), found at https://cascom.army.mil/asrp, is a website that offers links to commonly used sustainment resources for U.S. Army soldiers.  It is maintained by G-3 Training and Doctrine Combined Arms Support Command (CASCOM), Fort Lee, Virginia in coordination with the Soldier Support Institute at Fort Jackson, SC.

This portal directs the soldiers to training and doctrine resources, as well as products pertaining to lessons learned, leadership development, the operations process, virtual training products, and training focus areas.  

It also provides access to proponent-specific resources for Quartermaster, Ordnance, Transportation, Financial Management and Human Resources.

The goal of the Army Sustainment Resource Portal is to provide easy, consolidated and searchable access to the most relevant and authoritative sustainment products for the Army.

Military logistics of the United States